The 1994 Autoglass Trophy Final was the 11th final of the domestic football cup competition for teams from Second Division and Third Division for the Football League Trophy. The Final was played at Wembley Stadium, London on 24 April 1994. The match was contested by Huddersfield Town and Swansea City. Swansea City won the match 3–1 on penalties after drawing 1–1 in normal and extra time.

The match was Swansea City's first ever match at Wembley. Huddersfield Town, by comparison, had played there on three previous occasions in the 1928, 1930 and 1938 FA Cup Finals and losing all three of them.

Match details

Road to Wembley

Huddersfield Town

Swansea City

References

External links
Official website

Trophy Final 1994
EFL Trophy Finals
Football League Trophy Final 1994
Football League Trophy Final 1994
Tro
Football League Trophy Final 1994